Đỗ Thị Ngọc Châm (born 23 September 1985) is a Vietnamese former footballer who played as a forward. She has been a member of the Vietnam women's national team.

International career
Đỗ Thị Ngọc Châm capped for Vietnam at senior level during two AFC Women's Asian Cup qualifiers (2008 and 2010).

International goals
Scores and results list Vietnam's goal tally first

References

External links

1985 births
Living people
Sportspeople from Hanoi
Vietnamese women's footballers
Women's association football forwards
Vietnam women's international footballers
Footballers at the 2002 Asian Games
Asian Games competitors for Vietnam
21st-century Vietnamese women